Charles Ingram (born 1963) is a former British Army major convicted of cheating in the game show Who Wants to Be a Millionaire?.

Charles Ingram may also refer to:

 Charles Ingram (British Army officer) (1696–1748), British soldier and politician
 Charles Ingram, 9th Viscount of Irvine (1727–1778), British courtier and politician, son of the above
 Charles Ingram (cricketer) (1833–1868), British doctor of medicine and cricketer
 C. A. Ingram (1867–1937), American lawyer and legislator